The 28th Commonwealth Infantry Brigade Group was a Commonwealth formation of the Far East Strategic Reserve, based in Malaysia from 1955 to 1971 of which elements participated in the Malayan Emergency, Indonesia Confrontation and the Vietnam War.

History
The 28th Commonwealth Infantry Brigade Group was formed in Malaya on 16 September 1955 with a combination of forces from Australia, New Zealand and the United Kingdom. Its main elements were three infantry battalions from Australia, the United Kingdom and New Zealand and a British field artillery regiment with an Australian battery. The Brigade's operational role was as the 'Immediate Reaction Force' for the South East Asia Treaty Organisation.

The brigade was initially dispersed to various sites throughout Northern Malaya, including Penang, Ipoh and Taiping.  This provided logistical challenges, and after Malaysia Independence in 1957, Bukit Terendak close to Malacca was chosen as the new home for the Brigade. Terendak would house the entire brigade with its infantry battalions and support units, military hospital, airstrip, married quarters areas and shopping precinct. Terendak was of substantial size and covered several square miles with its southwestern border being the Straits of Malacca

Construction and occupation of Terendak was completed by August 1962, with the Brigade in place in its entirety. This brought all units of the Brigade together and under one roof. 

During the 1960s elements of the Brigade, either units or components of units would be detached for short periods from 28th Commonwealth Infantry Brigade Group to other commands or formations for operations in Peninsular Malaysia, Singapore, Borneo or South Vietnam.

From 1970 due to the changing winds of politics in London and Canberra the Brigade started to wind down and units were either disbanded or moved to other locations and on 31 October 1971 the Brigade ceased to exist when it relocated to Singapore and was renamed 28 ANZUK Infantry Brigade on 1 November 1971. Terendak was handed over to the Malaysian Army where it remains in use today.

Commanders
Command of the brigade was shared by the three contributing nations, Australia, New Zealand and the United Kingdom.

Order of battle
 Headquarters 28th Commonwealth Infantry Brigade
28 Commonwealth Infantry Brigade Def and Emp PL
28 Commonwealth Infantry Brigade Group LAD
28 Commonwealth Brigade Group Signal Squadron (1956 to 1957)
28 (Commonwealth) Signal Squadron (1957 to 1959)
208 Signal Squadron(Commonwealth) (1959 to 1970)
Artillery
Royal Artillery
14th Light Regiment, Royal Artillery, Terendak (1968 to 1969)
Headquarters Battery
No 1 Battery
No 5 Battery
Royal Australian Artillery
101st Battery (1959 to 1961)
103rd Battery (1961 to 1963)
102nd Battery (1964 to 1966)
'A' Battery(1965–1967)
107th Battery (1967 to 1969)
Engineers
11 Independent Field Squadron (1954 to 1970)
410 Plant Troop (1954 to 1962)
Medical
16 Field Ambulance, Penang (c1957)
16 Commonwealth Field Ambulance, Terandak (c1960's)
103 Australian Army Dental Section
Infantry
Australian Battalion
2nd Battalion, Royal Australian Regiment (1956 to 1957)
3rd Battalion, Royal Australian Regiment (1957 to 1959)
1st Battalion, Royal Australian Regiment (1959 to 1960)
2nd Battalion, Royal Australian Regiment (1961 to 1963)
3rd Battalion, Royal Australian Regiment (1963 to 1965)
4th Battalion, Royal Australian Regiment (1965 to 1967)
8th Battalion, Royal Australian Regiment (1967 to 1969)
1st Battalion, Royal Australian Regiment (1969 to 1971)
New Zealand Battalion
1st Battalion of the New Zealand Regiment (1958 to 1959)
2nd Battalion of the New Zealand Regiment (1959 to 1961)
1st Battalion of the New Zealand Regiment (1961 to 1964)
1st Battalion, Royal New Zealand Infantry Regiment (1964 to 1971)
British Battalion
1st Battalion, The Royal Scots Fusiliers(1954 to 1956)
1st Battalion, The Royal Lincolnshire Regiment (1956 to 1958)
1st Battalion, The Loyal Regiment (North Lancashire) (1957 to 1959)
1st Battalion, 3rd East Anglian Regiment (16th/44th Foot) (1959 to 1961)
1st Battalion, The King's Own Yorkshire Light Infantry (1961 to 1964)
1st Battalion, Scots Guards (1964 to 1966)
1st Battalion, The King's Shropshire Light Infantry(1967 to 1968)
3rd Battalion, The Light Infantry (1968 to Apr 1969)
Transport
3 Squadron RASC, Ipoh & Terandak (1952 to 1965)
3 Squadron RCT, Terandak (1965 to 1969)
Ordnance
28 Brigade Ordnance Field Park, Taiping (c1957)
28 Commonwealth Brigade Ordnance Field Park, Terandak (c1960's)
Workshop
2 Infantry Workshop, Taiping & Terandak (1955 to 1970)
Military Police
 28th Commonwealth Infantry Brigade Provost Unit
Pay
257 Field Cash Office
Postal
368 Postal Unit RE, Terendak

References

Military alliances involving Australia
Military alliances involving New Zealand
Military alliances involving the United Kingdom
20th-century military alliances
Military units and formations of the New Zealand Army
Military units and formations established in 1955
Military units and formations disestablished in 1971
New Zealand
1955 establishments in Malaya